The Hales Mansion is a mansion built in 1916 in Oklahoma City's Heritage Hills neighborhood.

History
The Second Renaissance Revival house was built for William Taylor Hales (1867-1938), a prominent business man of early Oklahoma City, in 1916 at a cost of $125,000 USD. In 1939, the mansion was bought by the Roman Catholic Archdiocese of Oklahoma City and served as the residence of the archbishop until it was converted back into a private residence in 1992. The mansion was added to the National Register of Historic Places in 1978. In April 2017, the mansion was bought by an Oklahoma City radiologist for $2.125 million.

Architecture
The house contains 20,021 square feet of living space spread over three floors, and an additional 3,136 square feet of basement, making the Hales Mansion the largest residence in Oklahoma City. The mansion was designed by the firm Hawk & Parr and is constructed of Bedford limestone and bricks imported from Greece. The main entrance on the east facade is a large, two-story portico supported by eight Corinthian columns. The secondary entrance on the north facade, facing the Overholser Mansion, is also a two-story portico but supported by four columns. On the ground level, the main entrance opens into a grand hall and a grand staircase.

References

National Register of Historic Places in Oklahoma County, Oklahoma
Renaissance Revival architecture in Oklahoma
Residential buildings completed in 1916
Oklahoma County, Oklahoma